The 1951 USC Trojans baseball team represented the University of Southern California in the 1951 NCAA baseball season. The Trojans played their home games at Bovard Field. The team was coached by Rod Dedeaux in his 10th year at USC.

The Trojans won the California Intercollegiate Baseball Association championship, the Pacific Coast Conference Tournament and advanced to the College World Series, where they were defeated by the Tennessee Volunteers.

Roster

Schedule 

! style="" | Regular Season
|- valign="top" 

|- align="center" bgcolor="#ccffcc"
| 1 || March 9 ||  || Bovard Field • Los Angeles, California || 12–2 || 1–0 || 0–0
|- align="center" bgcolor="#ccffcc"
| 2 || March 20 ||  || Bovard Field • Los Angeles, California || 11–9 || 2–0 || 0–0
|- align="center" bgcolor="#ffcccc"
| 3 || March 24 || at  || Unknown • San Diego, California || 10–12 || 2–1 || 0–0
|- align="center" bgcolor="#ccffcc"
| 4 || March 30 ||  || Bovard Field • Los Angeles, California || 9–6 || 3–1 || 1–0
|- align="center" bgcolor="#ccffcc"
| 5 || March 31 || Stanford || Bovard Field • Los Angeles, California || 10–9 || 4–1 || 2–0
|-

|- align="center" bgcolor="#ccffcc"
| 6 || April 10 ||  || Bovard Field • Los Angeles, California || 12–7 || 5–1 || 2–0
|- align="center" bgcolor="#ccffcc"
| 7 || April 13 ||  || Bovard Field • Los Angeles, California || 6–1 || 6–1 || 3–0
|- align="center" bgcolor="#ccffcc"
| 8 || April 14 || Santa Clara || Bovard Field • Los Angeles, California || 10–0 || 7–1 || 4–0
|- align="center" bgcolor="#ffcccc"
| 9 || April 20 || at Stanford || Sunken Diamond • Stanford, California || 1–6 || 7–2 || 4–1
|- align="center" bgcolor="#ccffcc"
| 10 || April 21 || at  || Edwards Field • Berkeley, California || 7–4 || 8–2 || 5–1
|- align="center" bgcolor="#ccffcc"
| 11 || April 21 || California || Edwards Field • Berkeley, California || 5–3 || 9–2 || 6–1
|- align="center" bgcolor="#ccffcc"
| 12 || April 24 || Loyola Marymount || Bovard Field • Los Angeles, California || 10–5 || 10–2 || 6–1
|- align="center" bgcolor="#ffcccc"
| 13 || April 27 || California || Bovard Field • Los Angeles, California || 6–7 || 10–3 || 6–2
|- align="center" bgcolor="#ccffcc"
| 14 || April 28 || California || Bovard Field • Los Angeles, California || 7–6 || 11–3 || 7–2
|-

|- align="center" bgcolor="#ccffcc"
| 15 || May 1 || San Diego State || Bovard Field • Los Angeles, California || 3–2 || 12–3 || 7–2
|- align="center" bgcolor="#ccffcc"
| 16 || May 5 || at Santa Clara || Unknown • Santa Clara, California || 5–2 || 13–3 || 8–2
|- align="center" bgcolor="#ffcccc"
| 17 || May 6 || at Santa Clara || Unknown • Santa Clara, California || 3–4 || 13–4 || 8–3
|- align="center" bgcolor="#ccffcc"
| 18 || May 7 || at Stanford || Sunken Diamond • Stanford, California || 10–2 || 14–4 || 9–3
|- align="center" bgcolor="#ccffcc"
| 19 || May 8 ||  || Bovard Field • Los Angeles, California || 12–7 || 15–4 || 9–3
|- align="center" bgcolor="#ccffcc"
| 20 || May 11 || at  || UA Field • Tucson, Arizona || 7–2 || 16–4 || 9–3
|- align="center" bgcolor="#ffcccc"
| 21 || May 12 || at Arizona || UA Field • Tucson, Arizona || 2–9 || 16–5 || 9–3
|- align="center" bgcolor="#ccffcc"
| 22 || May 18 ||  || Bovard Field • Los Angeles, California || 2–1 || 17–5 || 10–3
|- align="center" bgcolor="#ffcccc"
| 23 || May 19 || at UCLA || Joe E. Brown Field • Los Angeles, California || 2–4 || 17–6 || 10–4
|- align="center" bgcolor="#ccffcc"
| 24 || May 19 || at UCLA || Joe E. Brown Field • Los Angeles, California || 8–3 || 18–6 || 11–4
|- align="center" bgcolor="#ffcccc"
| 25 || May 22 || UCLA || Bovard Field • Los Angeles, California || 2–3 || 18–7 || 11–5
|-

|-
|-
! style="" | Postseason
|- valign="top"

|- align="center" bgcolor="#ccffcc"
| 26 || June 1 ||  ||  Bovard Field • Los Angeles, California || 6–4 || 19–7 || 11–5
|- align="center" bgcolor="#ffcccc"
| 27 || June 2 || Oregon State ||  Bovard Field • Los Angeles, California || 1–12 || 19–8 || 11–5
|- align="center" bgcolor="#ccffcc"
| 28 || June 2 || Oregon State ||  Bovard Field • Los Angeles, California || 10–7 || 20–8 || 11–5
|-

|- align="center" bgcolor="#ccffcc"
| 29 || June 13 || vs Princeton || Omaha Municipal Stadium • Omaha, Nebraska || 4–1 || 21–8 || 11–5
|- align="center" bgcolor="#ccffcc"
| 30 || June 14 || vs Utah || Omaha Municipal Stadium • Omaha, Nebraska || 8–2 || 22–8 || 11–5
|- align="center" bgcolor="#ffcccc"
| 31 || June 15 || vs Oklahoma || Omaha Municipal Stadium • Omaha, Nebraska || 1–4 || 22–9 || 11–5
|- align="center" bgcolor="#ffcccc"
| 32 || June 16 || vs Tennessee || Omaha Municipal Stadium • Omaha, Nebraska || 8–9 || 22–10 || 11–5
|-

|-
|

Awards and honors 
Hal Charnofsky
 First Team All-CIBA

Stan Charnofsky
 First Team All-CIBA

Al Karan
 First Team All-CIBA

Tom Lovrich
 First Team All-CIBA

Jay Roundy
 First Team All-American American Baseball Coaches Association

References 

USC Trojans baseball seasons
USC Trojans baseball
College World Series seasons
USC
Pac-12 Conference baseball champion seasons